ALX  may refer to:
Embraer EMB 314 Super Tucano, light attack aircraft
Hewa Bora Airways, Congo (ICAO code)
Thomas C. Russell Field, in Alabama, United States (IATA code)
Alexandria railway station, Scotland (National Rail code)
Union Station (Alexandria, Virginia) (Amtrak Code)
Alex Gardner (singer), a Scottish singer who performs under the stage name A-L-X
File name extension (".ALX") for various computer file types:
 ActiveX Layout file
 BlackBerry Application Loader File
 FPR2 or FPR2/ALX which is a receptor for certain lipoxins (also see Formyl peptide receptors)